Lucien Villa (17 November 1922 – 13 May 2018) was a French politician.

Villa was born in Carcassonne on 17 November 1922. As a teenager, Villa was active in the Popular Front and the French Resistance. He later joined the National Front. Villa was arrested in September 1942 and jailed for eighteen months. Soon after his release, he enlisted in the First Army. After World War II ended, Villa began working for RATP Group. He sat on the National Assembly as a member of the French Communist Party from the 31st district of Paris from 1967 to 1968, and returned to the office between 1973 and 1981.

Villa was named a chevalier of the Légion d'honneur in November 2015, and died at the age of 95 on 13 May 2018.

References

1922 births
2018 deaths
People from Carcassonne
Politicians from Occitania (administrative region)
French Communist Party politicians
Deputies of the 3rd National Assembly of the French Fifth Republic
Deputies of the 5th National Assembly of the French Fifth Republic
Deputies of the 6th National Assembly of the French Fifth Republic
French Resistance members
Chevaliers of the Légion d'honneur